Seamus Donnelly is the name of:

Seamus Donnelly (footballer), Irish retired professional footballer
Seamus Donnelly (IRA), member of the Provisional IRA
Seamus Donnelly is the drummer for Birmingham band SnowBabes